Shakedown cruise is a nautical term in which the performance of a ship is tested.  Generally, shakedown cruises are performed before a ship enters service or after major changes such as a crew change, repair or overhaul.  The shakedown cruise simulates working conditions for the vessel, for various reasons. For most new ships, the major reasons are to familiarise a crew with a new vessel and to ensure all of the ship's systems are functional.

Overview
If the ship is the first of its class, it will likely also be performing its sea trials, a test of its performance. In this context, 'shakedown cruise' and 'sea trials' may be used interchangeably, though each has a slightly different meaning.  In such a case, it is likely that the ship's systems will be pushed to redline, or maximum capacity, to demonstrate the class's speed and other important traits.  Until bested by another ship of the same class, this shakedown performance will be the standard of the class's capabilities, and its success may determine whether the class is to enter full production.

In the travel industry a shakedown cruise is also undertaken to test the ship and service crew.  These test cruises are sometimes made with passengers travelling at a discount.

It has been suggested that the origin of "shakedown cruise" comes from the need to settle (or literally shake down) the ballast in the hold of a ship to ensure it is level in the water. However, this would only apply to very granular ballast material such as sand. The term is more likely to have arisen due to the transition from sail to power. The advent of engines within the hull of a ship caused severe vibration. Such vibration would  be aggravated by uneven running and different sea conditions. A new ship had many fixtures and fittings throughout its accommodation and work spaces. As the maiden voyage progressed, these would become loose, and in many cases fall to the deck (shaken down).  For this reason, it was common for the shipyard to send a 'shake-down' team with the ship on her maiden voyage.  These men would be specialists equipped with the proper tools and spares to relocate or replace any displaced fixtures or fittings.

Availability

A vessel is typically not committed to any timetables or tasks until it completes its shakedown cruise. As such, problems detected during the shakedown cruise can be fixed at minimal cost. While the ship is assigned to the industrial activity for this purpose, this period is known as an "availability". In the US Navy, the typical length of an availability is 45 to 120 days, and per regulation, must be completed no more than eleven months after the month the ship was first delivered. This is also known as a "post-shakedown availability".

Famous examples

The USS Triton, a nuclear-powered radar picket submarine, was the first vessel to execute a submerged circumnavigation of Earth while on its shakedown cruise in early 1960. Triton is the only U.S. Navy ship to receive a Presidential Unit Citation for its shakedown cruise. USS Massachusetts's shakedown cruise was Operation Torch.

References

Nautical terminology